The Palézieux–Bulle–Montbovon railway line is a  railway line in the canton of Fribourg, Switzerland. The line is owned and operated by Transports publics Fribourgeois (TPF).

History 
It was built by the Chemin de fer Châtel-St-Denis–Palézieux (CP). The Chemins de fer électriques de la Gruyère (CEG) built another line east from Châtel-St-Denis to Vaudens, opening on 23 July 1903. The CEG acquired the CP on 20 December 1907.

In 1942, the CEG merged with two other companies to form the Chemins de fer fribourgeois Gruyère–Fribourg–Morat (GFM). The GFM, in turn, became the Transports publics Fribourgeois (TPF) in 2000.

Route 
The line begins in Palézieux, where it terminates across the platform from the standard gauge Lausanne–Bern and Palézieux–Lyss lines of Swiss Federal Railways. From there the line runs east to Châtel-Saint-Denis, where there was an interchange with the St-Légier–Châtel-St-Denis railway line from 1904–1969, when it was abandoned. At Bulle it interchanges with two other TPF lines: the standard gauge Bulle–Romont railway line, and the standard gauge Bulle–Broc railway line, another former CEG branch that was rebuilt in 2021–2023. From Bulle, the line turns south, and continues to Montbovon, where it meets the Montreux–Lenk im Simmental line of the Montreux Oberland Bernois Railway.

Notes

References 
 

Railway lines in Switzerland
Metre gauge railways in Switzerland
Transport in the canton of Fribourg
Transport in the canton of Vaud
Railway lines opened in 1901
900 V DC railway electrification